The Department of Chemistry at MIT is one of the top university faculties in the world. Research conducted covers the entire field of chemistry, ranging from organic chemistry and biological chemistry to physical chemistry, inorganic chemistry, environmental chemistry, materials science and nanoscience.

History
The Department of Chemistry at MIT has been established since the Institute opened its doors in 1865.  It started with two professors, Charles W. Eliot and Francis H. Storer, and a class of 15 students.

In 1866, the department moved to its then new quarters in the basement of the Rogers Building in Boston.

In 1907, MIT awarded its first Ph.D. to three students in the field of physical chemistry.

Nobel laureates
The department has several Nobel Laureates among its faculty and alumni, including the following:
 Robert B. Woodward (Chemistry, 1965)
 Robert S. Mulliken (Chemistry, 1966)
 H. Gobind Khorana (Medicine & Physiology, 1968)
 Geoffrey Wilkinson (Chemistry, 1973)
 Charles J. Pedersen (Chemistry 1987)
 Sidney Altman and Thomas R. Cech (Chemistry, 1989)
 Elias J. Corey (Chemistry, 1990)
 Mario Molina (Chemistry, 1995)
 K. Barry Sharpless (Chemistry, 2001)
 Aaron Ciechanover (Chemistry, 2004)
 Richard R. Schrock (Chemistry, 2005).

Faculty

Current members

 Moungi Bawendi
 Stephen L. Buchwald
 Jianshu Cao
 Sylvia Ceyer
 Arup K. Chakraborty
 Christopher C. Cummins, Ph.D. 1993
 Rick L. Danheiser
 John M. Deutch, S.B. 1961, Ph.D. 1966
 Mircea Dincă
 Catherine L. Drennan
 John M. Essigmann, S.M. 1972, Ph.D. 1976
 Robert W. Field
 Frederick D. Greene
 Robert G. Griffin
 Mei Hong
 Barbara Imperiali
 Timothy F. Jamison
 Jeremiah Johnson
 Daniel S. Kemp
 Laura L. Kiessling
 Alexander M. Klibanov
 Stephen J. Lippard, Ph.D. 1965
 Mohammad Movassaghi
 Keith A. Nelson
 Elizabeth Nolan, Ph.D. 2006 
 Brad L. Pentelute
 Alexander Radosevich
 Ronald T. Raines 
 Gabriela Schlau-Cohen
 Richard R. Schrock
 Dietmar Seyferth
 Alex K. Shalek
 Matthew D. Shoulders
 Susan Solomon
 Jeffrey I. Steinfeld, S.B. 1962
 JoAnne Stubbe
 Daniel Suess
 Yogesh Surendranath, Ph.D. 2011
 Timothy M. Swager
 Steven R. Tannenbaum, S.B. 1958, Ph.D. 1962
 Troy Van Voorhis
 Xiao Wang
 Alison Wendlandt 
 Adam Willard
 Bin Zhang

Former members

 Robert A. Alberty
 Isadore Amdur
 Avery Ashdown
 James A. Beattie
 Klaus Biemann
 Arthur A. Blanchard
 George H. Büchi
 James Mason Crafts
 Alan Davison
 Charles W. Eliot
 Gregory Fu
 Carl W. Garland
 Leicester F. Hamilton
 Frederick G. Keyes
 H. Gobind Khorana
 Gilbert Newton Lewis
 Mario Molina
 Forris Jewitt Moore
 Avery A. Morton
 Lewis M. Morton
 Samuel Parsons Mulliken
 Daniel G. Nocera
 James Flack Norris
 Arthur Amos Noyes, S.B. 1886
 Irwin Oppenheim
 Joseph Sadighi
 Walter C. Schumb
 George Scatchard
 Peter Seeberger
 K. Barry Sharpless
 John C. Sheehan
 Robert J. Silbey
 Walter Stockmayer
 Francis H. Storer
 Henry P. Talbot
 Andrei Tokmakoff
 William Walker
 Christopher T. Walsh
 Cyrus Warren
 John S. Waugh
 Mark S. Wrighton
 Douglas Youvan
 Hans-Conrad zur Loye

Notable alumni

 Sidney Altman, S.B. 1960
 Elias J. Corey, S.B. 1948, Ph.D. 1951
 Roscoe G. Dickinson
 Robert S. Mulliken, S.B. 1917
 Charles J. Pedersen, S.M. 1927
 Ellen Swallow Richards, S.B. 1873
 Robert B. Woodward, S.B. 1936, Ph.D. 1937

References

External links

 MIT OpenCourseWare: Chemistry

Chemistry Department